The Bình An / Tây Vinh massacre was a series of massacres alleged to have been conducted by the ROK Capital Division of the South Korean Army between February 12, 1966 and March 17, 1966 of 1,200 unarmed citizens in the Go Dai village and other areas in the rural commune of Bình An/ Tây Vinh area, Tây Sơn District of Bình Định Province in South Vietnam.

The massacre was reported to have occurred over the course of three weeks, in which 1,004-1,200 civilians were allegedly massacred, primarily women, children, elderly men and infants. They were conducted as part of Operation Maeng Ho which formed a part of Operation Masher, and were reported as "enemy KIA".

Documents and testimonies on the massacre was internally investigated but not publicly disclosed until the news of the massacre and its outcome was uncovered by a Korean graduate student Ku Su-Jeong and reported in the Korean media. The Asian Human Rights Commission had reported on the massacre and sent a letter to Kim Dae-jung for justice on the matter, with Kim Dae-jung expressing regret for war-time atrocities on a state visit to Vietnam.

Reporting 

The Associated Press (AP) in April 2000 investigated allegations of the Bình An/Tây Vinh massacre and stated that it "was unable to independently confirm their [the Vietnamese victims'] claims" and wrote that "Neither the Pentagon nor the South Korean Defense Ministry would comment on the allegations or offer independent confirmation". The AP further reports "An additional 653 civilians were allegedly killed the same year by South Korean troops in neighboring Quang Ngai and Phu Yen provinces, according to provincial and local officials interviewed by the AP on a trip the government took two months to approve. As is routine with foreign reporters, several government escorts accompanied the AP staff. The AP was unable to search for documents that would back up the officials' allegations".

A Reuters story from January 2000 stated that "Three local officials, including one who said he survived the alleged killings, spoke at length about the events in Binh Dinh. The officials, who declined to be identified, said that in early 1966, Korean troops entered what was then the Binh An commune, a collection of villages within Tay Son district that they believed was a Viet Cong stronghold. The Koreans were intent on flushing out opposing forces, but civilians bore the brunt of their actions, the officials said. An official at Tay Son's Communist Party history unit said the attacks began in early 1966 and culminated in a massacre of 380 people on Feb. 26, 1966, at a place called Go Dai." and that "A People's Committee official in Tay Son district also confirmed the details, saying 1,200 people were killed. A government official in Hanoi said central authorities had later investigated what happened at Binh Dinh and compiled detailed reports, which showed more than 1,000 people were killed during the period, about 380 of them at Go Dai. 
However, when asked for comment and to confirm the alleged killings, Vietnam's foreign ministry said it did not want to dwell on the matter. "South Korean troops committed crimes against Vietnamese people. With humanitarian and peaceful neighbourly traditions, it is Vietnam's policy to close the past..." the ministry said in a statement in response to questions."

A series of reports by the Tuổi Trẻ newspaper chronicled life after the massacre in this village, chronicling the life of village massacre survivors. Survivors of the massacre have also testified at the Korean Peace Museum in Seoul, although these massacres were denied by some Korean veterans serving in South Vietnam.

See also

Military history of South Korea during the Vietnam War
War Remnants Museum

References

External links

Massacres in Vietnam
Mass murder in 1966
Massacres in 1966
History of Bình Định province
Vietnam War crimes by South Korea
Massacres committed by South Korea
South Korean war crimes
Military scandals
1966 in Vietnam
Military history of South Korea during the Vietnam War
February 1966 events in Asia
March 1966 events in Asia